Rudolf Röckl (12 January 1927 – 2 November 1976) was an Austrian footballer. He played in 24 matches for the Austria national football team from 1949 to 1956.

References

External links
 

1927 births
1976 deaths
Austrian footballers
Austria international footballers
Place of birth missing
Association footballers not categorized by position